Shokrabad (also Romanized as Shokrābād) is a village in Shalil Rural District of Miankuh District, Ardal County, Chaharmahal and Bakhtiari province, Iran. At the 2006 census, its population was 797 in 145 households. The following census in 2011 counted 870 people in 191 households. The latest census in 2016 showed a population of 823 people in 209 households; it was the largest village in its rural district. The village is populated by Lurs. The village is populated by Lurs.

References 

Ardal County

Populated places in Chaharmahal and Bakhtiari Province

Populated places in Ardal County

Luri settlements in Chaharmahal and Bakhtiari Province